Like all municipalities of Puerto Rico, Naranjito is subdivided into administrative units called barrios, which are roughly comparable to minor civil divisions, (and means wards or boroughs or neighborhoods in English). The barrios and subbarrios, in turn, are further subdivided into smaller local populated place areas/units called sectores (sectors in English). The types of sectores may vary, from normally sector to urbanización to reparto to barriada to residencial, among others. Some sectors appear in two barrios.

List of sectors by barrio

Achiote

Achiote Centro
Barriada La Aldea
Barriada La Colina
Camino Chago Vázquez
Camino Chilo Padilla
Comunidad Blas Vázquez
Comunidad Los Báez
Comunidad Neco Ortega
Comunidad Oscar Padilla
Comunidad Telésforo Torres
El Cuco
Fondo del Saco
Higuillales
La Galvana
Los Café
Los Nieves
Maravilla (Chícharo)
Residencial Candelario Torres
Sector Achiote Adentro
Sector Desvío
Sector El Cementerio
Sector El Llano
Sector El Peñón
Sector Felipe Velásquez
Sector La Cantera
Sector La Cuesta de Cundo
Sector La Loma
Sector La Palma
Sector Los Chévere
Sector Monchito Martínez
Sector Tanita Morales
Sector Toñito Padilla
Urbanización Jardines de Naranjito

Anones

Anones Díaz
Anones Don Tito
Carretera 152
Camino Manolín González
Comunidad Las Lágrimas
Comunidad Rogelio Ferrer
La Maya
La Sierra
Los Matos
Sector Álvaro Rodríguez
Sector Beltrán
Sector Cátala
Sector Cayito Ríos
Sector Cuatro Puertas
Sector El Cerro
Sector El Palmar
Sector El Pollito
Sector Flor Maure
Sector Fuentes
Sector Hernández
Sector Juan Sostre Coreano
Sector Los Vasallos
Sector Marcano
Sector Merce Alicea
Sector Mirador
Sector Molina
Sector Palin Cátala
Sector Pablo Cátala
Sector Punto Fijo
Rodríguez
Tito Cátala
Villa Polilla

Cedro Abajo

Camino Roberto Rodríguez
Camino Toño Nieves
Comunidad Belén
El Hoyo
Higuillales
Lalo López
Sector Berríos
Sector Cuatro Calles
Sector El Bronco
Sector Felipa Sánchez
Sector Juan Cosme
Sector Juan López
Sector La Cantera
Sector La Telefónica
Sector Las Cumbres
Sector Los Bistec
Sector Los Pagán
Sector Los Pelusa
Sector Mero Morales
Sector Pepe Morales
Sector Pepito Berríos
Sector Sabana

Cedro Arriba

El Abanico
Sector Ángel Avilés
Sector Cabrera
Sector El Banco
Sector El Pueblito
Sector El Riíto
Sector Feijoó Anones
Sector Feijoó Cedro Arriba
Sector Ferrer
Sector La Gallera
Sector La Pajona
Sector Las Cruces
Sector Loncho López
Sector Los López
Sector Los Morales
Sector Los Pomos
Sector Los Ríos
Sector Los Zayas
Sector Maná
Sector Moncho Rodríguez
Sector Peñabert
Sector San Antonio
Sector Sánchez
Sector Santa Rita
Sector Tiñín Ortega
Sector Xanadú

Guadiana

Camino Lico Cruz
Camino Moncho Pagán
Camino Pascual Rivera
Comunidad Lago La Plata
El Cuco
Guadiana Alto
La Hueca
Sector Alejandro (Entrada a Guadiana)
Sector Anselmo Cabrera
Sector Cabrera
Sector Colón
Sector Cuesta Las Abejas
Sector Guadiana Chinea
Sector Guadiana Espinel
Sector Guadiana Ortega
Sector Hatito
Sector La Gallera
Sector Lago Verde
Sector Los Juanes
Sector Negrón
Sector Otero
Sector Parcelas

Lomas

Lomas Jaguas
Parcelas Las Riveras (Lomas García)
Sector Arturo Morales
Sector Cleto
Sector Cuchillas
Sector Cuchillas Pacheco
Sector El Cielito
Sector Flor Rivera
Sector García
Sector Guayabo
Sector La Jagua
Sector La Rueda
Sector Loma Linda
Sector Lomas Centro
Sector Lomas Vallés
Sector Matos
Sector Quiles
Sector Rafael Padilla
Sector Sico Martínez (Los Pampers)
Sector Susín Vázquez
Sector Tacho Vázquez
Sector Tavo Vázquez (Chárriez)

Naranjito barrio-pueblo

Barriada La Marina
Barriada Monte Verde
Barriada San Antonio
Barriada San Cristóbal
Barriada San Miguel
Calle Georgetti
Calle Ignacio Morales Acosta
Calle Pedro Cid
Calle Víctor J. Mojica
Sector Acueducto

Nuevo

Camino Don Manolo
Camino González Mathews
Camino Los Matos
Eusebio Rivera
Parcelas Hevia
Sector Aponte
Sector Bernard
Sector Bunker Hills
Sector Cabrera
Sector Cintrón
Sector Cuadrado
Sector Doña Bacha
Sector Entrada Guadiana
Sector Febus
Sector Hevia
Sector Hogar Crea
Sector La Tosca
Sector Loma del Viento
Sector Martínez
Sector Matadero
Sector Mulitas
Sector Negrón
Sector Ortega
Sector Puente Plata
Sector Santa María (formerly Villa Embrolla)
Sector Siete Curvas
Sector Sostre
Urbanización Campo Bello
Urbanización Valle Verde
Villa del Plata

See also

 List of communities in Puerto Rico

References

Naranjito
Naranjito